Dinosaurland Fossil Museum (aka Dinosaurland) is a privately owned fossil museum in Lyme Regis, on the Jurassic Coast in Dorset, England. The museum is located in a historic Grade I listed former congregational church building.

Museum
The museum, opened in 1989, is owned and run by Steve Davies, a former chief palaeontologist for BP. It contains a collection of local marine fossils from the Jurassic period. The museum organizes guided fossil hunting walks. There is a museum shop that sells fossils and minerals.

The fossil collection is housed on the ground floor. As well as local Jurassic fossils, there are dinosaurs from China. There are also modern shells and skeletons on display. The museum has a small collection of dinosaur fossils on show (such as a large dinosaur coprolite, a Megalosaurus skeleton and a Chinese dinosaur, of unknown genus).

Congregational Church 
The museum is located on Coombe Street in a 250-year-old Grade I listed building that used to be a congregational church. The church was built between 1750 and 1755 by John Whitty. It was where Mary Anning (1799–1847), an early fossil hunter, was baptised and later attended for worship.

The two storey building has a hipped roof and rusticated quoins. The round-headed doorway has Doric pilasters on either side. There is a 19th-century addition to the left hand end of the building.

See also
 Lyme Regis Museum
 Charmouth Heritage Coast Centre
 The Dinosaur Museum in Dorchester, Dorset
 Jurassica, Isle of Portland
 Dinosaur Isle, Sandown, Isle of Wight
 Portland Museum

References

External links

 Dinosaurland Fossil Museum website

Museums established in 1989
Museums in Lyme Regis
Natural history museums in England
Jurassic Coast
Fossil museums
Paleontology in the United Kingdom
Dinosaur museums
Lyme Regis
Grade I listed churches in Dorset